American rapper Problem has released two albums, one extended play (EP), thirteen mixtapes and sixteen singles.

Albums

Mixtapes

Extended plays

Singles

As lead artist

As featured artist

Other charted songs

Guest appearances

References

Discographies of American artists
Hip hop discographies